Horseed FC vs Heegan FC was the first ever association football match to be aired live in Somalia.

Significance
The significance of this event is attributed to the fact that this sports event is an indication for the increasing visibility of stability in Somalia. After the country had undergone two decades and a half of civil war it made any semblance of entertainment unthinkable due to the fact that venues that hosted such events would usually be targeted. The Somali Football Federation president Abdiqani Said Arab considered the ability to broadcast live on local television as "a breakthrough" and evidence that the country is recovering after a lengthy period of violence. It was expected to attract a large number of fans from all over the country.

Overview
It simultaneously was also the most watched Somali football game in history, and described by media officials as ‘the most hotly-contested’ football game in Somalia ever. Deeq Abdullahi Nur AKA Aariyo scored the first goal for Heegan in the 32nd minute. In the second half however, Horseed upped their game after the equalizer by Adaani Barre Isse and the winning goal by Kenyan Daniel Matango.

See also
 Somalia League

References

Association football matches in Africa
Foo
Football competitions in Somalia